Peaking may refer to:

 Peaking, in improperly installed laminate flooring
 Antenna peaking, orienting a directional antenna toward the greatest radio signal amplitude
 Focus peaking, a feature in digital viewfinders that detects and highlights in-focus contours
 Peaking power plant, or peaker, a power plant that runs only when there is a high demand for electricity 
 Peaking tone, or rising-falling tone, in tonal languages

See also
Peak (disambiguation)
Peking (disambiguation), old Western name of Beijing, and its namesakes